PS Admiral Moorsom was a passenger paddle steamer operated by the London and North Western Railway from 1860 to 1885.

History

Admiral Moorsom  was built by Barclay Curle of Glasgow, Scotland, and launched in 1860. She was named after Admiral Robert Moorsom (1760-1835), an officer of the Royal Navy who served in the Battle of Trafalgar in 1805.

RMS Ulster towed her in to Holyhead. She was run into by the American sailing ship Santa Clara in the Irish Sea off Arklow, County Wicklow, on 15 January 1885 and sank. Twenty-five people were rescued by Santa Clara and five by the steamship Falcon, but five people were lost. Admiral Moorsom was on a voyage from Dublin to Holyhead, Anglesey.

References

1860 ships
Passenger ships of the United Kingdom
Paddle steamers of the United Kingdom
Ships built on the River Clyde
Ships of the London and North Western Railway
Maritime incidents in November 1862
Maritime incidents in January 1885
Ships sunk in collisions
Shipwrecks in the Irish Sea